The earliest mentioning of Estonian singing dates back to Saxo Grammaticus' Gesta Danorum (c. 1179). Saxo spoke of Estonian warriors who sang at night while waiting for a battle. Henry of Livonia at the beginning of the 13th century described Estonian sacrificial customs, gods and spirits. In 1578 Balthasar Russow described the celebration of midsummer (jaanipäev), the St. John's Day by Estonians. In 1644 Johann Gutslaff spoke of the veneration of holy springs and J.W. Boecler described Estonian superstitious beliefs in 1685. Estonian folklore and beliefs including  samples of folk songs appear in Topographische Nachrichten von Liv- und Estland by August W. Hupel in 1774–82. J.G von Herder published seven Estonian folk songs, translated into German in his Volkslieder in 1778 and republished as Stimmen der Völker in Liedern in 1807.

At the beginning of the 19th century during the Estophile Enlightenment Period (1750–1840), increased interest in Estonian folklore occurred among Baltic Germans. J.H. Rosenplänter founded Beiträge zur genauern Kenntniß der ehstnischen Sprache, a journal for studies on Estonian language, literature, and folklore. In Beiträge the German translation of Mythologia Fennica by Kristjan Jaak Peterson was published in 1822. In 1839 The Learned Estonian Society was founded as the central organization for collecting and studying Estonian folklore. In 1842 the Society of the Estonian Literati was founded in Tallinn.

Friedrich Reinhold Kreutzwald started collecting Estonian folklore in 1843 but ended up changing the tales considerably. The materials collected primarily from Virumaa were reworked and published as The Old Tales of the Estonian People in 1866.
Alexander H. Neus' anthology Ehstnische Volkslieder (3 vols; 1850–52) is considered the first scholarly publication on Estonian folksongs. In total 1,300 songs are given in Estonian language and in German translation.
The president of The Society of the Estonian Literati, Pastor Dr. Jakob Hurt, considered the "king of Estonian folklore" began collecting Estonian folklore in the 1870s. The total amount collected is approximately 12,400 pages. In The Old Harp (Vana Kannel), 2 volumes of folksongs were published from 1875–76. Two more volumes were added in 1938 and 1941. The Setus Songs (Setukeste laulud) in 3 volumes were published from 1904–1907. Inspired by Hurt's work, Matthias J. Eisen started a folklore collection in the 1880s resulting a collection of 90,000 pages. Oskar Kallas, Ph.D (1868–1946) studied at the University of Helsinki and was the first folklore scholar of Estonian descent.

After the establishment of the Republic of Estonia, Walter Anderson was appointed to the newly founded chair of folklore at the University of Tartu. Anderson's most significant students were Oskar Loorits and :et:August Annist. Loorits became the director of the Estonian Folklore Archives founded in 1927. His major field was folk religion and mythology, a study on Estonian, Livonian and Russian folk beliefs. His most monumental work Grundzüge des estnischen Volksglaubens was published from 1949–1957 in Copenhagen. Arvo Krikmann and Ingrid Sarv assembled the five-volume Estonian proverb collection "Eesti vanasõnad" between 1980 and 1988.

Footnotes

References

 
Estonian culture